This is a list of winners of the Sundance Film Festival Directing Award for documentary features.

Winners

1990s
1998: Moment of Impact
1999: Regret to Inform

2000s
2000: Paragraph 175 -  Rob Epstein and Jefferey Friedman
2001: Dogtown and Z-Boys - Stacy Peralta
2002: Sister Helen
2003: No award
2004: Super Size Me - Morgan Spurlock
2005: The Devil and Daniel Johnston - Jeff Feuerzeig
2006: Iraq in Fragments
2007: War/Dance
2008: American Teen - Nanette Burstein
2009: El General

2010s
2010: Smash His Camera
2011: Resurrect Dead: The Mystery of the Toynbee Tiles
2012: The Queen of Versailles
2013: Cutie and the Boxer
2014: The Case Against 8
2015: Cartel Land
2016: Life, Animated - Roger Ross Williams
2017: The Force - Peter Nicks
2018: On Her Shoulders - Alexandria Bombach
2019: American Factory - Steven Bognar and Julia Reichert

2020s
2020: Time - Garrett Bradley
2021: Users - Natalia Almada
2022: I Didn't See You There
2023: A Still Small Voice - Luke Lorentzen

References

Sundance Film Festival
Awards established in 1998
Awards for best director
Documentary film awards